Calle Brown (born July 1, 1992) is an American soccer player who last played for Loudoun United FC in the USL Championship.

College and semi-professional
Brown played college soccer for the  Virginia Cavaliers from 2010 to 2014. In 2013, he quit the team due to a lack of playing time after being beaten out for the starting role. However, he returned to the team and was named starter in 2014.  In total, Brown made 30 appearances for the Cavaliers. In 2014, he led the team to the NCAA Division 1 national championship. He was named the tournament's most valuable defensive player after recording shutouts against the University of Maryland-Baltimore County in the semifinal and UCLA in the championship game. In 2011 and 2014, Brown also played for the Northern Virginia Royals of the semi-professional Premier Development League. He made seven appearances and five appearances for the club in 2011 and 2014, respectively.

Professional
On March 13, 2015 it was announced that Brown had signed for the Pittsburgh Riverhounds of  the USL. Brown was seen as a potential starter for the club while Ryan Thompson, the club's regular starter, missed time while away on international duty with Jamaica. Brown made his professional debut on May 16, 2015 against the Richmond Kickers as Thompson was ruled out because of a back injury and was set to leave for international duty the following day. He made several stops in the eventual 1–1 draw with his only goal allowed coming off of a defensive error. Brown finished his first professional season with 14 league appearances for the Riverhounds and another in the club's 2015 Lamar Hunt U.S. Open Cup extra time- defeat to D.C. United. He was also the Riverhounds' goalkeeper in their first round exit of the 2015 USL playoffs as the club was defeated 2–4 in extra time.

In October 2015, Brown announced that he would be joining the Houston Dynamo of Major League Soccer for the 2016 season. The deal was officially announced by the club on December 17, 2015.

Following his release from Houston, Brown joined Seattle Sounders FC on February 20, 2018.

Brown signed with hometown club Loudoun United FC on February 12, 2019. He was released after the 2019 season.

Career statistics

References

External links
Riverhounds profile
UVA profile
 

1992 births
Living people
American soccer players
Virginia Cavaliers men's soccer players
Northern Virginia Royals players
Pittsburgh Riverhounds SC players
Houston Dynamo FC players
Rio Grande Valley FC Toros players
Seattle Sounders FC players
Tacoma Defiance players
NCAA Division I Men's Soccer Tournament Most Outstanding Player winners
Loudoun United FC players
Association football goalkeepers
Soccer players from Virginia
USL League Two players
USL Championship players
People from Leesburg, Virginia